There are many cultural aspects surrounding how societies view menstruation. Different cultures view menstruation in different ways. The basis of many conduct norms and communication about menstruation in western industrial societies is the belief that menstruation should remain hidden. By contrast, in some hunter-gatherer societies, menstrual observances are viewed in a positive light, without any connotation of uncleanness.

A menstrual taboo is any social taboo concerned with menstruation. In some societies it involves menstruation being perceived as unclean or embarrassing, inhibiting even the mention of menstruation whether in public (in the media and advertising) or in private (among friends, in the household, or with men). Many traditional religions consider menstruation ritually unclean, although anthropologists say that the concepts 'sacred' and 'unclean' may be intimately connected.

Mythology
The terms menstruation and menses are derived from the Latin  ('month'), which in turn is cognate with the Greek  ('moon') and the roots of the English words month and moon.

According to anthropologists Thomas Buckley and Alma Gottlieb, cross-cultural study shows that while taboos about menstruation are nearly universal, and while many of these involve notions of uncleanliness (ritual impurity), numerous menstrual traditions "bespeak quite different, even opposite, purposes and meanings." In some traditional societies, menstrual rituals are experienced by women as protective and empowering, offering women a space set apart from the male gaze and from unwanted sexual or domestic pressures and demands. In other words, the idea of the seclusion of the menstruation hut may be perceived as banishment of the woman seen to be impure and taboo, or as a welcome space and time free of the usual daily chores: isolation versus retreat.

An instructive example is provided by the anthropologist Wynne Maggi, who spent years living in the peasant society of the Kalash people of the Chitral District in northwestern Pakistan. She describes the communal  (large menstrual house) as the village's 'most holy place', respected by men, and serving as women's all-female organizing centre for establishing and maintaining gender solidarity and power. According to one body of cultural evolutionary scholarship, the idea that menstrual blood marks the body as periodically sacred was initially established by female coalitions in their own interests, although later, with the rise of cattle-ownership and patriarchal power, these same beliefs and taboos were harnessed by religious patriarchs to intensify women's oppression.

Metaformic Theory, as proposed by cultural theorist Judy Grahn and others, places menstruation as a central organizing idea in the creation of culture and the formation of humans' earliest rituals.

Synchronisation with the moon
Menstruation in synchrony with the moon is widely assumed in myths and traditions as a ritual ideal. The idea that menstruation is—or ideally ought to be—in harmony with wider cosmic rhythms is one of the most tenacious ideas central to the myths and rituals of traditional communities across the world. One of the most thoroughgoing analyses of primitive mythology ever undertaken was that of the French anthropologist Claude Lévi-Strauss, who concluded that, taken together, the indigenous myths of North and South America expressed men's worry that, unless women's periods were carefully monitored and synchronised, the universe might descend into chaos.

In Aboriginal Australia, the supernatural being known as the 'Rainbow Snake' has been interpreted as, among other things, an indigenous way of conceptualising the ideal of synchronised tidal, lunar, menstrual and seasonal periodicities whose overall harmony (it is believed) confers spiritual power and fertility.

To many, such cultural associations appear persuasive in view of the fact that in humans, the menstrual cycle quite closely approximates the moon's 29.5-day synodic cycle, unlike in chimpanzees (~36 days) or bonobos (~40 days). Statistical information from hunter gatherers is lacking, but where large-scale western studies focus on women's peak reproductive years—removing outlier values—the cycle length gravitates around 29.1–29.5 days, while the figure for women in their thirties shortens toward 28 days. In no current human population has statistically significant lunar phase-locking been demonstrated.

Sacred and powerful

In some historic cultures, a menstruating woman was considered sacred and powerful, with increased psychic abilities, and strong enough to heal the sick. According to the Cherokee, menstrual blood was a source of feminine strength and had the power to destroy enemies. In Ancient Rome, Pliny the Elder wrote that a menstruating woman who uncovers her body can scare away hailstorms, whirlwinds and lightning. If she strips naked and walks around the field, caterpillars, worms and beetles fall off the ears of corn. Menstrual blood is viewed as especially dangerous to men's power. In Africa, menstrual blood is used in the most powerful magic charms in order to both purify and destroy.
Mayan mythology explains the origin of menstruation as a punishment for violating the social rules governing marital alliance. The menstrual blood turns into snakes and insects used in black sorcery, before the Maya moon goddess is reborn from it.

Where women's blood is considered sacred, the belief is that it should be ritually set apart. According to this logic, it is when sacred blood comes into contact with profane things that it becomes experienced as ritually dangerous or 'unclean'.

Menstruation and humoral medicine 

Many beliefs amount menstruation in the early modern period were linked to humorism, the system of medicine introduced by Ancient Greek and Roman physicians. People believed that the human body contained four humours: blood, phlegm, yellow bile, and black bile. Illnesses and problems were understood as being caused by dyscrasia, or an imbalance in the four humours. Treatments for disease had the aim of restoring a balance, curing the patient. The humoral model was a continuity during the early modern period, despite the fact that new medical theories began to arise in the second half of the eighteenth century, because these new ideas which used different treatments involving new chemicals were not as trusted since they were not properly established.

In this way medical and popular beliefs about menstrual problems such as irregular menstruation, amenorrhea (absence of periods whilst fertile) or dysmenorrhea (painful periods) were thought of in relation to the four humours. In early modern western Europe, physicians believed that the womb could not be too cold, hot, moist or dry and that an excess in any of these could impact a woman's fertility. Significantly, people believed that warmth encouraged sexual pleasure and increased the probability of conceiving a child, meaning that the womb had to be warm during intercourse. If a woman was found to be having problems menstruating which would then impact their fertility, remedies which aimed to alter the humoral state of the body were used. Aphrodisiacs were a common remedy given to women with menstrual problems, since they were believed to have internal heating effects, stimulating menstruation by redressing the constitutional balance of a womb that was too cold.

Religious views
The sociological theorist Emile Durkheim argued that human religion in its entirety emerged originally in connection with menstruation. His argument was that a certain kind of action—collective ritual action—could establish simultaneously totemism, law, exogamy and kinship in addition to distinctively human language and thought. Everything began, according to Durkheim, when a flow of blood periodically ruptured relations between the sexes. 'All blood is terrible', he observed, 'and all sorts of taboos are instituted to prevent contact with it'. During menstruation, females would exercise a 'type of repulsing action which keeps the other sex far from them'. This same blood was thought to run through the veins of women and animals alike, suggesting the blood's ultimate origin in 'totemic'—part-human, part-animal—ancestral beings. Once menstrual blood had been linked with the blood of the hunt, it became logically possible for a hunter to respect certain animals as if they were his kin, this being the essence of 'totemism'. Within the group's shared blood resided its 'god' or 'totem', 'from which it follows that the blood is a divine thing. When it runs out, the god is spilling over'.

Judaism

In Judaism, a woman during menstruation is called niddah and may be banned from certain actions. For example, the Jewish Torah prohibits sexual intercourse with a menstruating woman. The ritual exclusion of niddah applies to a woman while menstruating and for about a week thereafter, until she immerses herself in a mikvah (ritual bath) which is basically intended only for married women. During this time, a married couple must avoid sexual intercourse and physical intimacy. Orthodox Judaism forbids women and men from even touching or passing things to each other during this period. While Orthodox Jews follow this exclusion, many Jews in other branches of the religion do not.

In the Torah (Leviticus 15:19-30), a menstruating female is considered ritually unclean: "anyone who touches her will be unclean until evening" (New International Version). Touching a menstruating female, touching an object she had sat on or lain on, or having intercourse with her also makes a person ritually unclean. The extent to which these rules are observed in modern Judaism varies depending on the degree of conservatism/orthodoxy.

In Genesis 31:34-35, menstruation is referenced in a story, where Rachel was, or pretended to be in her menstrual period:Now Rachel had taken the teraphim, and put them in the saddle of the camel, and sat upon them. And Laban felt about all the tent, but found them not. And she said to her father: 'Let not my lord be angry that I cannot rise up before thee; for the manner of women is upon me.' And he searched, but found not the teraphim.

Christianity

Most Christian denominations do not follow any specific rituals or rules related to menstruation. Other denominations, such as those of Oriental Orthodox Christianity, follow rules similar to those laid out in the Holiness Code section of Leviticus, somewhat similar to the Jewish ritual of niddah. Pope Dionysius of Alexandria held with regard to menstruating women that "not even they themselves, being faithful and pious, would dare when in this state either to approach the Holy Table or to touch the body and blood of Christ." As such, Oriental Orthodox Christian women, such as those belonging to the Coptic Orthodox Church, do not attend church while they are menstruating.

Some Church Fathers defended the exclusion of women from ministry based on a notion of uncleanness. Others held that purity laws should be discarded as part of the Old Covenant. The 4th century text Apostolic Constitutions says:For neither lawful mixture, nor child-bearing, nor the menstrual purgation, nor nocturnal pollution, can defile the nature of a man, or separate the Holy Spirit from him. Nothing but impiety and unlawful practice can do that. (italics supplied)Some Christian churches, including many authorities of the Eastern Orthodox Church and some parts of the Oriental Orthodox Church advise women not to receive communion during their menstrual period, not because menstruation is considered to be sinful, but for more intense preparation to approach Christ and due to the physical difficulties faced by women. This is a fairly common practice throughout Greece and Russia and other historically Orthodox Christian countries, as well as by Orthodox Christians in countries where they are in the minority, including Egypt, Kerala and Syria.

In 735 the Latin Church decided that women must be allowed to attend liturgies and receive Holy Communion during their menstruation.

Islam

During menstrual periods, women are excused from performing prayers. Sets of rules are advised for women to follow while during menstruation. They should not fast and left over fasts of Ramadan are to be completed during other days. During menses pilgrimages are allowed; and circumambulation of the Kaaba is also permitted. They are permitted to enter the praying place of the mosque but are excused from prayer and are encouraged to be present at Muslim gatherings and festivals (Eids). After the period, a bath (Ghusl), which is also required of both partners after sex, is also required before prayer may continue.

The traditional Islamic interpretation of the Qur'an forbids intercourse during a woman's menstrual period, but allows for physical intimacy and other sexual acts that are not intercourse. If a man is engaged in sexual intercourse with his wife and discovers that her period has started, he must immediately withdraw.

On authority of Urwa:

Buddhism 
In Buddhism (Theravada or Hinayana) menstruation is viewed as "a natural physical excretion that women have to go through on a monthly basis, nothing more or less". However, in certain branches of Japanese Buddhism, menstruating women are banned from attending temples.
In Nichiren Buddhism (Japan) menstruation is not considered a spiritual obstacle to religious practice, although a menstruating woman may choose not to bow, for comfort. During menstruation, women should not enter temples or shrines, being seen as polluted. In Sri Lankan Buddhism, this is also true for their husbands and other men, who have been in a home with menstruating women.

Hinduism

Hinduism's views on menstruation are diverse. Menstruation is seen as a period of purification, and women are often separated from place of worship or any object pertaining to it, for the length of their period. This forms the basis of most of the cultural practices and restrictions around menstruation in Hinduism.

Sikhism
Menstruation does not lead to women being considered impure in Sikhism, and women's behavior is not restricted during the time when she is menstruating.

In The Feminine Principle in the Sikh vision of the Transcendent, Nikky Guninder Kaur-Singh writes:The denigration of the female body "expressed in many cultural and religious taboos surrounding menstruation and child-Birth" is absent in the Sikh worldview. Guru Nanak openly chides those who attribute pollution to women because of menstruation.

Others

Baháʼí Faith 
Bahá'u'lláh, the founder of the Baháʼí Faith, in the Kitáb-i-Aqdas abolished all forms of ritual impurity of people and things and stressed the importance of cleanliness and spiritual purity. Menstruating women are encouraged to pray and are not required to fast; they have the (voluntary) alternative of reciting a verse instead.

Jainism 
In Jainism, the bleeding that occurs in menstruation is thought to kill micro-organisms in the body, making the female body exhausted, causing cramps, and producing stress. Hence, women are expected to rest and not perform any religious duties for a duration of four days. In this time, the man of the house may take up the duties of the woman.

Shinto 

In Japan, the religion of Shinto did and still does play a part in their society. The Kami, the spirits they worshiped, would not grant wishes to those who had traces of blood, dirt, or death on them. While menstruation is not entirely blood, the ancient Japanese did not know that. As a result, women who were menstruating were not allowed to visit any of the Kami shrines for the duration of their menstrual period. Even today, women are not allowed to enter Shinto shrines and temples during menstruation, and in some instances, women are completely banned from climbing the tops of sacred mountains due to their 'impurity'. Furthermore, the tradition is kept somewhat alive in the belief that the shedding of the endometrial lining is a kind of death. The tradition relates to the thought that any death in the family brings impurity and those experiencing this must wait a certain amount of time before being able to return to shrines and other holy areas.

Chinese religions 
In Chinese belief systems, women are not supposed to touch sacred statues, make offerings, or pray to sacred statues on their menstrual cycle. Before the revolution some temples only permitted men, and women who were very old or very young, to attend. Chinese views of menstruation are still deeply influenced by Confucianism values of virtue and chastity. Many women feel empowered and feminine in their early years of starting their menstrual cycles.

Wicca and paganism 
Menstruation is mentioned in some Wiccan and pagan texts. There are collected books and material on Witchcraft and menstruation at the Museum of Witchcraft and Magic.

In the 2010s public Wiccan and pagan practitioners began sharing rituals, spells and histories of menstruation in these belief systems. Pagan rituals and histories of menstruation is also discussed in books such as Penelope Shuttle and Peter Redgrove's The Wise Wound: Menstruation and Everywoman.

By region

Africa
Across the continent of Africa, a wide variety of menstruation-related customs have been recorded. In 2014 UNESCO reported that an estimated 10% of girls in Sub-Saharan Africa do not go to school while menstruating.  This is likely due to a lack of resources rather than cultural customs of exclusion.

Ghana
Religious taboos and social stigma concerning menstruation contribute to a lack of access to school for girls in Ghana. In rural areas of the country 95% of girls have reported missing school during their periods. The World Bank estimates that 11.5 million women in Ghana do not have access to adequate hygiene and sanitation.

Zambia
A cloth torn from the traditional wrap (chitenge) is worn, part tied around the waist and part looped under the crotch, to catch menstrual fluid. Menarche (the first menstrual cycle at puberty) is traditionally treated as a sign that the girl is probably ready for sex and marriage, as well as for adult duties in the household. Initiation rites on menarche include instruction on sex and marital relations as well as on menstrual management. This is conducted by older women. It is taboo to talk about menstruation with men, or to learn from one's own mother.

South and South East Asia
In some portions of South Asia, there is a menstrual taboo, with it frequently being considered impure. Restrictions on movement, behaviour and eating are frequently placed. According to a 2018 study, more than one-third of girls across South Asia do not go to school during menstruation.

Laos 
A small study in a rural area in Laos (Savannakhet) found that menstruation is considered taboo and shameful. This creates difficulties in sharing knowledge at school and at home. Also, there is a low level of menstrual hygiene management. This has a negative effect on social opportunities in achieving good health, moving around freely and going to school. Some menstruating women (16%) wear double-layer skirts (sinhs) while in the private sphere, compared to 54% who wear disposable pads.

India 
In most of India, menarche is celebrated as a positive aspect of a girl's life. For example, in Andhra Pradesh, girls who experience their menstrual period for the first time are given presents and celebrations to mark the occasion.

In some traditional homes in India, girls and women face restrictive taboos relative to menstruation, such as being denied entry to the kitchen. In areas around the Jhabua district of Madhya Pradesh, the belief is that "menstruation is a disease and not a normal biological process", and therefore women who are menstruating are not allowed to sleep on beds, enter kitchens, touch male members of their family or eat spicy foods.

In a 2014 study conducted in India, the researchers found that as many as 42% of women who participated in the study did not know about sanitary pads or the anatomical origin of their menstruation. The researchers noted that women reused old rags to deal with their menstrual discharge, and that "Most of them were scared or worried on first menstruation." 88% of menstruating women in rural India use alternatives to sanitary pads such as old fabric, rags, sand, ash, wood shavings, newspapers and hay.

Keddasa 

Keddaso (also transliterated Keddasa, and also known as Bhumi Puje, and in Tulu as  ), is popularly known as the "festival of worshipping Mother Earth" in the Tulu Nadu region of Karnataka in South India. It is believed that on this day, Bhoomi Devi undergoes menstruation and the day is celebrated holistically in Tulu Nadu. This is an important four-day festival celebrated in the closing days of the Tulu month Ponny (Gregorian month of February).

Sabarimala Temple

Sabarimala Temple is situated at the place of that name in Pathanamthitta District, Kerala. Women of reproductive age were not permitted to worship there; the ban was said to be out of respect to the celibate nature of the deity to whom it is dedicated, Shasta, an underage teenage male. A Kerala high-court judgement had legalized this interpretation, and forbade women from entering the temple since 1991. In September 2018, a judgement of the Supreme Court of India ruled that all Hindu pilgrims regardless of gender can enter. The Constitution bench of the Supreme Court held that any exception placed on women because of biological differences violates the Constitution – that the ban violates the right to equality under Article 14. This verdict led to protests, demonstrations and violence by millions of Ayyappa devotees (both male and female) supported by the Hindu right-wing Bharatiya Janata Party and opposed by the LDF led state government. About ten women attempted to enter Sabarimala, despite threats of physical assault, but failed to reach the sanctum sanctorum. Defying such protests, two women activists belonging to the previously barred age group associated with the ruling Communist Party of India (Marxist) finally entered the temple through the rear gate, on the early hours of 2 January 2019, with the help of police and local administration. When this alleged action was brought to the notice of the temple priests and authorities, the temple was closed for ritual purification. Controversy regarding the implementation of this verdict continues.

Ambubachi Mela in the Kamakhya Temple 

Assamese and Bengali Hindus adhering to Shaktism celebrate the menstruation of the goddess Kamakhya during the Ambubachi Mela, an annual fertility festival held in June, in Kamakhya Temple, Guwahati, Assam, India. The temple stays closed for three days and then reopens to receive pilgrims and worshippers. It is one of the most important pilgrimage sites in India, attracting millions of visitors each year, particularly for Ambubachi Mela which draws upwards of 100,000 pilgrims per day during the four-day festival. Before the temple is closed for Ambubachi, a white cloth is placed over the yoni (vulva)-shaped stone in which the goddess Kamakhya is worshipped in the temple. At the end of Ambubachi, when the temple is reopened and Ambubachi Mela is held, the assembled devotees are provided with fragments of that cloth, now reddened to signify menstrual blood.

Indonesia

In Bali, a woman is not allowed to enter the kitchen to perform her usual duties, nor is she allowed to have sex with her husband while menstruating. She is to sleep apart from the family and has to keep her clothes that she wears while menstruating away from any clothes that she could wear to the temple. One of the most important regulations is that a woman is not allowed to attend temple while menstruating.

In Sumba, women keep their cycles secret, which makes men see them as deceitful. Women from Sumba believe that because of their secrecy, they will always have control of the men. "Men will never know how much we really can do to control these things. We have all kinds of secrets, and they should always believe that we can control even more than we really can".

Women are supposed to avoid intercourse while menstruating. It is believed that sexually transmitted diseases are the results of women deceiving men and having intercourse while they are menstruating. Gonorrhea translates as 'disease you get from women' in Sumba; it has become a social problem. When a man gets this disease, the only way it is believed he can rid himself of the painful sores is to pass it to a woman. The reasoning is that a woman's body can absorb infection and purge it during a cycle.

Nepal 

Hindus in Nepal traditionally keep women isolated during menstruation; women who are menstruating are not allowed in the household for a period of three nights. This practise was banned by the Nepalese Supreme Court in 2005 but still continues. Community and organizational actions exist to combat the practice. In January 2019, local authorities demanded the destruction of chhaupadi huts in Bajura, the municipality in which a woman and her two young sons died in a hut. This resulted in the removal of 60 sheds, and the deployment of law enforcement to patrol for further removal.

Sri Lanka 
According to a 2018 study, two-thirds of girls in Sri Lanka received no information about menstruation before reaching puberty. The lack of education leads to many girls getting sick due to being ill-informed about their bodies and menstrual cycles. In addition, at least one-third of girls missed school during their periods due to a lack of accessible toilets or pads.

There is also a ritual surrounding young girls, which starts with their first menstruation and ends with them receiving soft sex education. Throughout this ritual the girl can not be left alone and must always have another girl with her. If that girl must be away, she leaves an iron axe to prevent spirits from trying to influence the girl in the ritual. This part of the process continues for three months after the completion of the majority of the ritual, meaning the girl is potentially a woman before she receives any education on sex.

United States
Traditionally, the Yurok in North America practiced menstrual seclusion. Yurok women used a small hut near the main house.

A survey conducted in 1981 showed that a substantial majority of U.S. adults and adolescents believed that it is socially unacceptable to discuss menstruation, especially in mixed company. Many believed that it is unacceptable to discuss menstruation even within the family. Studies in the early 1980s showed that nearly all girls in the United States believed that girls should not talk about menstruation with boys, while more than one-third of girls did not believe it appropriate to discuss menstruation with their father.

A 2018 survey of 1,500 women in the US showed that 60% of women feel embarrassed when they menstruate.

United Kingdom 
In 2017, Scottish MSP Monica Lennon began work to present an 'Ending Period Poverty' bill to government. In 2019 it was officially lodged and debated in Holyrood. It was approved in November 2020 and made Scotland the first country in the world to make it a legal requirement for period products to be available for free to anyone who needs them.

In 2019, the Government Equalities Office launched a Period Poverty Taskforce to research and end the problem of people who cannot afford menstrual products.

Society and culture

Education 
Menstruation education is frequently taught in combination with sex education in the US, although one study suggests that girls would prefer their mothers to be the primary source of information about menstruation and puberty. A Nigerian study showed the following breakdown in menstruation education: "parents of 56%, friends of 53%, books of 46%, teachers of 44%, internet of 45%, and health centers of 54" held the most influence in terms of menstruation education. Information about menstruation is often shared among friends and peers, which may promote a more positive outlook on puberty.

The quality of menstrual education in a society determines the accuracy of people's understanding of the process. This is in part due to the segregation of male and female peers during educational sessions. Failure to teach an accurate understanding of menstruation to students of all genders has social implications for gendered relationships and the objectification of women's bodies. Discomfort arises when students do not have access to the same information, reinforcing the belief "that menstruation is gross and should be kept hidden". Girls are encouraged to conceal the fact that they may be menstruating in order to be considered desirable. Sexual harassment and teasing about menstruation cause girls anxiety as they must struggle to ensure that they give no sign of menstruation.

Effective educational programs are essential to providing children and adolescents with clear and accurate information about menstruation. Several education and sexual health experts have studied the key features necessary for such programs. Some experts maintain that schools are an appropriate place for menstrual education to take place because they are an institution that young people attend consistently. Schools are intended to expand students' knowledge and thus serve as an appropriate site for conveying menstrual education.

Other experts argue that programs led by peers or third-party agencies are more effective than those taught in the school classroom. This may be due to the use of small group interactions, the ability of these programs to target specific populations, or the possibility that many teenagers choose to participate voluntarily in these programs, rather than being mandated to attend school programs.

Advertising
Menstrual product advertising began in the early twentieth century. Early ads included print magazine campaigns from Tambrands Inc (Tampax), Kimberly-Clark (Kotex) and brands that have since been discontinued. Advertising for menstrual products outside the US began somewhat later. In Norway, SABA began openly advertising after the Second World War, driving a brightly colored bus around the country to provide information to consumers.

Historically, menstrual product advertising has had to balance frankness and information with taboos and censorship laws against discussing or showing menstrual themes. Educational pamphlets and school outreach has been an important way of marketing to young consumers during the twentieth century.

One common way that sanitary-product advertising avoids depicting menstruation is by pouring a blue, rather than red, liquid on the sanitary product to demonstrate its absorption. Historically, this has been due to strict censorship rules regarding menstrual product advertising.

In 2010, the Always feminine hygiene brand created the first feminine hygiene ad to ever feature a tiny red spot, representing blood. The ad was created by intern and artist William Chyr who was working at Always' advertising agency, Leo Burnett. Originally the ad was created for the intern's personal portfolio, but then it caught the attention of the chief creative officer at Leo Burnett, and was subsequently published as an actual ad. There was some controversy when the ad was first released. In June 2016 the presence of red blood in a UK Bodyform commercial was greeted with approval in social media for its attempt to challenge the stereotypical menstruation ad, by showing women who struggle despite bleeding from cuts, blows and bruises they receive while playing various sports. Later, Bodyform's owner, Essity, launched campaigns featuring blood-like liquid in the campaign "Blood Normal".

Visual arts 

Menstrual art engages with menstrual themes, including blood, pain, menopause and menstrual stigma. Although not new in the twentieth century, a noted increase in artistic engagement began in the late 1960s, at the time of second-wave feminism, with artists including Shigeko Kubota, Carolee Schneemann, Judy Clark, Judy Chicago, Catherine Elwes, Marina Abramović, Gina Pane, Ana Mendieta, and later Orlan. Since the 1960s, artists have continued to take an interest in menstrual art. Menstrual art highlights different issues regarding menstrual joy, taboos and pain.

In 2015, artist Rupi Kaur was censored by Instagram for posting menstrual art series Period. Kaur critiqued Instagram's position, writing: "Thank you Instagram for providing me with the exact response my work was created to critique.... I will not apologize for not feeding the ego and pride of misogynist society that will have my body in an underwear but not be okay with a small leak, when your pages are filled with countless photos/accounts where women ... are objectified, pornified, and treated [as] less than human". Instagram later reversed their decision, and menstrual art has since flourished on the platform.

Art history has recently begun to explore this theme in art, drawing on a longer historiography of gender and the body in modern and contemporary art explored by feminist art historians, for example Ruth Green-Cole, Kathy Battista, and Bee Hughes.

The 2015 conference of the Society for Menstrual Cycle Research sponsored a group exhibition, curated by artist Jen Lewis, which resulted in a catalogue. In 2020, Norwegian museum Telemark Kunstsenter held an exhibition about menstruation named SYKLUS.

Films, TV, books
Movies and television also reflect the taboo nature of menstruation. Typically menstruation as a topic is avoided, except for scenes involving menarche, a girl's first period. For example, as Elizabeth Arveda Kissling explains in her article, "On the Rag on Screen: Menarche in Film and Television", the 1991 film My Girl contains a scene where the main character, Vada, experiences her first period.  The explanation given to her by a female role model of what is happening to her is done off-camera and the subject is never mentioned again, save when Vada pushes Thomas across the porch telling him, "Don't come back for five to seven days."

In the 1976 movie Carrie, the title character has her first period in high school, and becomes hysterical in the gym shower believing she is dying. The other girls tease her by throwing tampons and sanitary pads at her. The gym teacher tries to calm Carrie down, and eventually must explain the concept of menstruation to Carrie (because Carrie's mother had never done so). When Carrie returns home announcing she's a woman and inquiring why she was never told about periods, her fanatically religious mother yells at her and locks her into a closet fearing that menstruation will bring men and the sin of sex. Later in the movie, her classmates mock her ignorance of menarche again by pouring pig's blood on her at the prom.

The 1979 novel Endless Love by Scott Spencer has a 20-page love scene in which menstrual blood is no barrier to the obsessive union of the couple.

In the 1991 Japanese animated film Only Yesterday, one of the girls is found to be going through menstruation and is later teased about it, especially when a group of boys tell the others not to touch a ball she had touched by saying, "You'll catch her period".

Clueless, the 1995 cult-classic best known for its iconic fashion and memorable one-liners, contains one of the most cited period lines of all time. Protagonist Cher, when receiving a second tardy for being late to class, uses the excuse of 'riding the crimson wave' as her reason for receiving her second tardy.

In the 2007 movie Superbad, Seth discovers menstrual blood on his jeans after dancing with a woman. He reacts with disgust, as do other men in the scene. The scene has been described by critics as "[encapsulating] the attitudes of disgust and shame associated with periods."

Netflix's Big Mouth features Jessi Glaser, played by Jessi Klein, getting her period for the first time on a school trip to the Statue of Liberty in season one episode two. As Jessi frets in the bathroom her male friend, Andrew Glouberman, played by comedian John Mulaney, finds her a menstrual product.

The 2018 Bollywood comedy-drama Pad Man was inspired by the life of social activist Arunachalam Muruganantham. As a newly wed man, he wishes to help his wife get better access to sanitary products after finding out that she has to live in separate quarters during her period. He works hard in order to create a low-cost pad accessible to every woman in India. His journey was chronicled by Twinkle Khanna in her fictional story The Legend of Lakshmi Prasad.

The 2020 film Borat Subsequent Moviefilm features a scene that uses humor and irony to subvert taboos surrounding menstruation. In the scene, Borat and his daughter Tutar do a "fertility dance" at a debutante ball, and the audience is enthusiastic about the dance until Tutar lifts her dress to reveal she is menstruating, which prompts disgust and walkouts amongst the crowds. The scene was praised by writers for its satirization of common menstruation stigmas. As said by Lindsay Wolf of Scary Mommy, since society has "been conditioned…to basically pretend that periods don't exist, putting them in the spotlight like [the film] did forces us to confront that 1) they happen, and 2) we need to get over it and stop treating girls like dainty little prizes who secretly have them."

More realistic and accurate representations of periods onscreen have increased with the number of women in production roles in TV and film, with notable examples including films The Runaways and Turning Red, and the TV series Broad City, Orange is the New Black, I May Destroy You, and Yellowjackets. Yellowjackets, a series which involves a group of female characters who must learn to survive while stranded in the wilderness, received praise for not ignoring the subject of periods in comparison to other survival dramas. In the fifth episode of season one, the series addresses the issue of the girls’ periods and how they must improvise in the wild with makeshift pads.

Though Turning Red does not explicitly address menstruation, it is used as a metaphor for a girl’s coming-of-age. The film sparked controversy amongst critics who thought the topic of menstruation was inappropriate to reference in a children's movie, while others disagreed and emphasized the importance of normalizing a process that is a part of growing up for girls.

Menstrual suppression

With the recent FDA approval of menstrual suppression medications, researchers have begun to shift their focus to the attitudes of American women toward their periods. One study in particular found that 59% of the women they surveyed reported an interest in not menstruating every month.  Of these, one-third said they were interested in not menstruating at all anymore.

Anthropologists Lock and Nguyen (2010) have noted that the heavy medicalization of the reproductive life-stages of women in the West mimic power structures that are deemed, in other cultural practices, to function as a form of "social control". Medicalization of the stages of women's lives, such as birth and menstruation, has enlivened a feminist perspective that investigates the social implications of biomedicine's practice. "[C]ultural analysis of reproduction... attempts to show how women... exhibit resistance and create dominant alternative meanings about the body and reproduction to those dominant among the medical profession."

Activism

Menstrual activism (otherwise known as radical menstruation, menstrual anarchy, or menarchy) is a movement that addresses menstrual taboos. Overcoming this taboo is a point of contention amongst feminists. The primary argument behind this movement is that if menstruation is normal, there is no reason why the topic should be avoided: "After a while it becomes psychologically disorienting for women to look out at a world where their reality doesn't exist."

The prominent rise of menstrual activism began with the rise of feminist spiritualist menstrual activists in the late 1960s. In 1973, a "Bleed In" was held by Janice Delaney, Mary Jane Lupton, and Emily Toth, who believed that their shared menstruation experience merited discussion. The rise of early menstrual activism was prompted by rising cases of toxic shock syndrome due to unhygienic menstrual practices, which prompted responses feminists and menstrual activists alike. As such, a group of women gathered in Boston in the spring of 1969, calling themselves the Boston Women's Health Book Collective (BWHBC). This culminated in the publishing of a manual called Women & Their Bodies, which has been adapted and currently sells today under the title of Our Bodies, Ourselves. Though the manual itself rarely discussed menstruation, it opened the floodgates for an honest criticism of the way women's health is discussed. In the following decades, women's liberationists called for pushback against the status quo. A primary vehicle for these messages was through art; in 1971, Judy Chicago created "Red Flag", a photolithograph, and a year later, an interactive art installation called "Womanhouse". Artistic expression transcended into national recognition, as evidenced by figures like Emily Culpepper. Culpepper released a short film in 1972 that featured menstruation images that detailed realities of having one's period. The fame generated from this piece made Culpepper the figure of knowledge surrounding menstruation for laypeople, and initiated her nationwide involvement with the BWHBC.

The height of second-wave feminism led to landmark changes during this period, including the establishment of the Society for Menstrual Cycle Research and literature that more directly addressed the existence of menstrual stigma.

Menstruation can be conceptualized as a stigmatized condition that both reflects and reinforces women's perceived lower status in relation to men. Feminist scholars extend this theory to explain negative attitudes towards women's bodily functions. Such stigmatization occurs when menstrual blood is viewed as one of the "abominations" of the body and reflects a gendered identity among women, which leads to consequences for women's psychological and sexual well-being.

Feminists such as Chella Quint have spoken against the use of shaming in advertising for feminine hygiene products. She created a zine, Adventures in Menstruating, to "help alter the visibility of menstruation, so that it's at least normal to talk about it. Because, right now, it's not". Other menstrual activists include Rachel Kauder Nalebuff, who published My Little Red Book; filmmaker and academic Giovanna Chesler, who created the documentary Period: The End of Menstruation; and artist Ingrid Berthon-Moine, who exhibited a video and series of photographs at the Venice Biennale.

Menstruation activism has also begun to emerge in China in recent years. Starting with the outbreak of COVID-19 in China, a grassroots movement provided free sanitary pads to diverse groups of women in China and aims to remove the stigma of menstruation. Starting by donating menstrual products to female frontline health workers in Wuhan in February 2021, the movement features the wider discussion sparked by the hashtag "package-free sanitary pads" on social media platform Weibo in September 2021 and reveals the unspeakable pain of period poverty to the public. Following the campaign by the advocacy group Stand By Her on social media, university students set up "sanitary pad help boxes" and provide free sanitary pads at over 250 campuses in China.

At 16 years old, Nadya Okamoto founded the organization PERIOD, and wrote the book Period Power: a Manifesto for the Menstrual Movement.

New York Congresswoman Grace Meng has been a longstanding advocate for menstrual equity, and proposed the Menstrual Equity for All Act of 2021 to Congress. Many women's rights organizations have endorsed this bill, including the Alliance for Period Supplies, Plan, Girls Inc., Human Rights Watch, and I Support the Girls in addition to their various campaigns that fight for destigmatization, free menstrual products, and more.

Activism roles have also been taken on by young Black women like the Brown sisters, who founded the organization 601 For Period Equity in response to the "white-washed" nature of many other organizations.

Medicine 
Blood from female menstruation has been used in medicines. In Chinese Daoist alchemy, menstrual blood from females who had not had sexual intercourse was used to make a substance to prolong an individual's life, called red lead. The substance was taken by the Ming dynasty Jiajing Emperor and the abuses inflicted on the palace women to ensure the blood's purity led to the Renyin palace rebellion.

Menstrual synchrony

Menstrual synchrony is an alleged process whereby women who begin living together in close proximity experience their menstrual cycle onsets (the onset of menstruation or menses) becoming more synchronized together in time than when previously living apart. A 2013 review concluded that menstrual synchrony likely does not exist.

Menstruation products
Menstrual products are part of menstrual culture, as they are prominent in shops, through advertising and through disposal methods (such as sanitary bins and bags). Throughout the twentieth-century applicator tampons like Tampax (Always) and pads such as Kotex were increasingly popular in the Global North. 

There are environmental costs of using menstruation products containing plastic and chemicals. As an alternative, companies are manufacturing reusable period panties, cloth menstrual pads, menstrual cups, biodegradable sanitary napkins and other eco-friendly products. Not all cultures use menstrual products, opting instead for natural materials or homemade options.

Menstrual inequity 

The term menstrual inequity refers to the disparities in affordability, accessibility, destigmatization, and safety of menstrual products. Furthermore, calls for menstrual equity expand into demands for reproductive justice, which includes the subtopics of education, support systems, and healthcare. Menstruation is a highly stigmatized biological process, to the extent that most women feel uncomfortable discussing their experiences. In the CBSN documentary "Period", New York Congresswoman Grace Meng discussed the complex feelings of shame that come with menstruation and how it contributes to gender inequality.

Beyond the perpetuation of gender inequality, the inclination to hide menstruation experiences contributes to the phenomenon of period poverty. Period poverty is defined as "a lack of access to menstrual products, education, hygiene facilities, waste management, or a combination of these", according to Medical News Today. In fact, 25% of women cannot purchase period products due to income limitations. Furthermore, period products cannot be purchased with government subsidies like food stamps, health spending allowances, Medicaid, or health insurance.

Socioeconomic inequity 
Menstruating is an expensive process, and thus difficulty in accessing period products disproportionately impacts low-income people. Especially with laws like the tampon tax and the lack of free menstrual products in most bathrooms, many are forced to miss school or work due to lack of access. One in five low-income women have reported missing work, school or similar events due to lack of access to period supplies.

With regards to mental health, 68.1% of women experiencing monthly period poverty expressed that they were experiencing moderate or severe depression compared to 43.4% of women who experienced no period poverty.

In 2021, 51% of female students wore period products for longer than recommended. Overtime use of period products may lead to the onset of toxic shock syndrome, in addition to the chances of used pads and tampons having the ability to carry STIs. In a different study with low-income women, 64% of participants explained that they could not afford menstrual products in the previous year. Of these women, around one-third expressed that they resorted to other products like rags, toilet paper, and children's diapers.

The COVID-19 pandemic has only exacerbated these concerns in a time when unemployment and financial insecurity has risen. In March 2020, the CARES Act allowed for money from health savings and flexible spending accounts to be used for the purchasing of menstrual products.

In 2017, the U.S. Department of Justice promised to grant every woman incarcerated in a federal prison menstrual products free of charge. Yet countless women are not housed in a federal prison, and go without access to period products keeping them safe and hygienic. 54% of women in prisons do not have access to sufficient period supplies, as they are forced to spend their 75 cent per hour wages at commissaries that charge up to 5 dollars for pads and tampons.

Efforts are now being made to reduce period poverty in Scotland, as it became the first country in the world to make period products free in August 2022. The Period Products Act made it a legal duty for local authorities to provide free period products such as tampons and sanitary pads to "anyone who needs them."

Racial inequity 
Like many other health-related concerns, women's experiences are influenced by their race. Medical racism extends to discussions of period pain as well.

Dismissal of period pain is further implicated by the history of violence against black women, originating with slavery and continuing into its aftermath. Dr. J. Marion Sims, who is heralded as the father of obstetrics and gynecology, performed risky surgeries without anesthesia on enslaved women in order to experiment.  A study performed through a series of interviews highlighted that for black and Latina women, all the women in the study reported a normalization of pain by medical professionals. This was not surprising to the author of the study, given that women are proven to be less likely to report their pain when they are shot down in their attempts to seek out help. Women in the study expressed atypical symptoms such as 47-day-long periods, excruciating cramps, and unrelenting constipation—and still were dismissed by medical professionals. These women, up to multiple decades later, were diagnosed with severe illnesses like pituitary tumors and polycystic ovary syndrome. The denial of pain for women of color does not stop at delayed diagnoses and daily pain, and rather has larger implications for mental health.

Negative relations and perceptions of one's uterus and uterine functions potentially may make many hesitant to call on their reproductive system in the future. Especially considering high black maternal mortality rates, the connection between poor relationships with reproductive health and adverse consequences is glaring.

Fibroids are a particularly important condition to mention when discussing racial disparities in menstrual health. Uterine fibroids are significantly more likely to occur in black women, with 9 out of 10 black women being diagnosed with fibroids before the age of 50. Black women also face higher rates of adverse symptoms, like extreme pain and heavy menstrual bleeding. Impacts on black women are further worsened by the fact that 42 percent of black women wait four years or more before seeking out treatment for fibroids, compared to 29 percent of white women. Fibroids have immense consequences in terms of cancer risk, as black women who have fibroids have shown to be 40 percent more likely to have some form of endometrial cancer. Analogously, it has been demonstrated that black women are equally as likely to have endometriosis, but are significantly less likely to be diagnosed with the disease compared to white women.

All of the aforementioned health risks result in what physicians and activists alike label as "period trauma". Dr. Charis Chambers, a board certified OB/GYN, explains that "I would define period trauma as any sustained psychological, social, or emotional injury/distress related to or caused by menstruation". Almost half of black school-attending women reported that they are not able to do their best on school work because of their periods. Especially considering the additional systemic burdens faced by black people, missing school and becoming further behind in the system worsens phenomena like the wage gap between white and black women.

Transgender people 

66 percent of trans men feel uncomfortable or unsafe using their preferred restroom. Correspondingly, 66% of transgender men thought people felt negative or very negative about masculine-presenting people who menstruate. Menstruating on its own is difficult, when accounting for period stigma and period pain, but the added burden of gender dysphoria can be traumatizing for many. Many trans men and trans masculine people feel uncomfortable with vaginal penetration, as penetration in itself is strongly associated with femininity and womanhood. Period poverty disproportionately affects transgender menstruators, because these populations already face poverty, unemployment, incarceration, and underemployment at much higher rates.

Menstruation activism 
Menstruation activism has become more prominent during third-wave feminism, with a range of arguments being made across global scholarship and cultures. Much of the menstruation activism in the West has centered on arguments against what many feminists believe to be the misuse of menstruation to 'prove' female biological inferiority. While some feminists have argued that Western patriarchy has used the inability for women to control their menstruation as evidence of the female body suffering from limitations, others have focused on historical works that deem menstrual blood 'dirtier' than other blood, because it results from the failed reproductive cycle. Activists in literary fields and gender studies have noted a history of menstruation as being symbolic for evil or secrecy, and argue against the long standing stigmatization of menstruation in order to elevate masculinity. Thus, menstrual activism has grown to include a variety of arguments, including, but not limited to: social, philosophical, political, and theoretical. All of these efforts make up the Menstrual Equity Movement, which seeks to correct menstruation as a driving force for social and political inequality.

One focus of activism has been to challenge high taxes on menstrual products, otherwise known as period tax. In recent years, activists around the world have turned their attention to lowering and/or abolishing the higher taxes placed on menstrual products, because some states and countries consider them "luxury items". In the US, the tax on menstrual products can reach up to 10%, depending on state legislature. In 2020, Hungary had one of the largest, taxing up to 27% on menstrual products. Still, some activists have raised concerns that the focus on period tax is halting broader, more important activism, like challenging the social and medical stigma that surrounds menstruation. Still, the movement to lower period tax has persisted, and has been deeply connected to another movement against period poverty.

Period poverty is defined as a lack of access to anything dealing with menstruation, including hygienic products or facilities, education, and waste management. A global study conducted in 2021 showed that roughly 500 million women and girls experience period poverty. The effects of period poverty can range from physically not being able to attend school and/or work while menstruating, as well as negatively impact mental health. A US study conducted in 2021 showed that roughly 68% of women who reported experiencing period poverty monthly, also expressed having feelings of moderate to severe depression. This same study also revealed differences across racial lines in the US, as Latinx women reported the highest rates of period poverty, followed by Black women, and then white women, particularly from low-income communities. Although research into period poverty has focused primarily on cisgender women in low/middle income communities and countries, other scholars have begun examining how period poverty affects non-binary and transgender individuals as well.

Menstrual pain and the LGBT community 
Recent scholarship has argued that menstruation, although a strictly biological function, has been imbued with gender/sex identity. Thus, as advocacy for, and awareness of transgender and non-binary individuals increases across the globe, menstrual activism is evolving as well. Effects of the gendered perceptions of menstruation on the LGBTQIA+ community differ, but current debates about the issue focus primarily on two key topics, transfeminine and transmasculine menstrual pain.

Transmasculine menstrual pain, like transfeminine, includes both physical and mental components. As trans men and non-binary individuals may still menstruate, they often experience the same negative side-effects of menstruation, like cramping. Similarly some argue that the negative effects it may have on mental health have been underexplored. As menstruating conflicts with conventional ideas about masculinity, activists are concerned about the dysphoric gender identity that can arise from menstruating, after someone has chosen to transition or adopt a gender identity not linked to their sex at birth. Some AFAB individuals (assigned female at birth) and non-binary individuals have expressed concern about the tension between menstruating and affirming their chosen gender identity. Scholars have begun arguing for a non-gendered conception of menstruation in both social and medical settings, in an attempt to alleviate the discomfort AFAB and non-binary individuals feel during menstruation. Examples of this can include but are not limited to: using clinical, non-gendered language to describe menstruation, saying 'cycle' rather than 'period', or 'menstrual products' rather than 'feminine hygiene products'. Finally, researchers have also noted that many AFAB and non-binary individuals who menstruate encounter barriers in public restrooms, as men's restrooms do not have sanitary disposal bins in the stalls, and there are often few cubicles in comparison to urinals. This results in AFAB and non-binary individuals having to wait for access to stalls, and dispose of their menstrual products in the public waste bin. Thus, advocacy for gender-neutral bathrooms has become a more recent part of Menstruation Activism.

See also

Arunachalam Muruganantham (subject of the 2013 documentary Menstrual Man)
Grandmother hypothesis
Menophilia, colloquially menstruation fetish
Menstrual hygiene day
Menstruation celebration
Chhaupadi, a menstrual taboo in Nepal
Metaformic Theory
Seclusion of girls at puberty
The Story of Menstruation (1946 animated film)
Vagina and vulva in art
Period. End of Sentence. (2018 documentary)

References

External links
  Museum of Menstruation

Feminine hygiene
Menstrual cycle
Taboo
Feminism and health